La Llagonne is a commune in the Pyrénées-Orientales department in southern France.

Geography 
La Llagonne is located in the canton of Les Pyrénées catalanes and in the arrondissement of Prades.

History 
First time skiing in the Pyrénées happened on January 29, 1901 at La Llagonne.

Population

See also
Communes of the Pyrénées-Orientales department

References

Communes of Pyrénées-Orientales